Jacob Andrew "Jake" Odum (born February 11, 1991) is a former Assistant basketball coach for Indiana State.  He's also a former American professional basketball player who last played for Pistoia Basket 2000 of the Italian Lega Basket Serie A (LBA). He is a 6 ft 4 in (1.93 m) tall point guard-shooting guard.

Coaching career
Odum was an assistant basketball coach at his alma mater, Indiana State assuming the position on Sept 3, 2020.  He previously served as the Indiana State assistant director of player personnel / assistant strength coach during the 2019-20 season upon retiring from professional basketball after 5 season in European leagues.

College career
Odum played college basketball at Indiana State University, with the Sycamores, from 2010 to 2014.  He led the Sycamores to a 4-yr record of 79–55 (.590), a MVC title and 4 post-season tournament berths (1x NCAA, 2x NIT, 1x CiT).

He currently stands 6th in career scoring (1,568 pts), 13th in career rebounds (617), 2nd in assists (603), 3rd in steals (204), 1st in games played (134),  made free throws (590), games started (131) and minutes played (4,199).

Professional career
After going undrafted in the 2014 NBA draft, Odum played on the Indiana Pacers' Orlando Summer League team. He then played on the Sacramento Kings' Las Vegas Summer League team.

Odum began his pro career with the Greek League club PAOK for the 2014–15 season, choosing to sign with the Greek club, rather than take his chances at that particular time in an NBA training camp, despite a couple of offers from NBA teams.

After leading PAOK to a 3rd-place finish in the Greek League, Odum signed with Medi Bayreuth of Germany for the 2015–16 Bundesliga season. He was named to the Eurobasket.com German Bundesliga All-Newcomer Team.  Odum was one of the best players of the team and was then committed by the Franconian rival s.Oliver Würzburg for the 2016–17 Bundesliga season.  He was named to the EuroBasket.com All-German Bundesliga Honorable Mention team.

On July 13, 2017, Odum signed with Turkish club Banvit. On November 17, 2017, he left Banvit and signed with Russian club Nizhny Novgorod for the rest of the 2017–18 season.

On November 13, 2017, Odum signed with Promitheas Patras B.C. in Greece. On March 4, 2019, Odum left Promitheas Patras and signed with Pistoia Basket 2000 in Italy.

Coaching career
Odum joined Indiana State as assistant director of player personnel and assistant strength coach in 2019. In September 2020, he was promoted to assistant coach.  Following the termination of Head Coach Greg Lansing in March, 2021; Odum was released with the entirety of Lansing's staff.

Awards and accomplishments

College
Portsmouth Invitational Tournament (2014) Under Armour All-Select Tournament Team
2× All-Missouri Valley Conference First Team: (2014, 2013)
2× Missouri Valley Conference tournament All-Tournament Team: (2014), (2011)
NABC All-District 16 First Team: (2013)
NABC All-District 16 Second Team: (2012) 
All-Missouri Valley Conference Second Team: (2012)
Diamond Head Classic All-Tournament Team: (2012)
Old Spice Classic All-Tournament Team (2011) – to date, Odum is the only player in Old Spice Classic history to achieve a "Triple-Double" (10 points, 10 rebounds, 12 assists)
Missouri Valley Conference All-Freshman Team: (2011)
Missouri Valley Conference All-Newcomer Team: (2011)
Missouri Valley Conference All-Defensive Team: (2011)
Missouri Valley Conference Honorable Mention: (2011)

References

External links
NBA.com Profile
European Basketball stats
EuroCup Profile
FIBA Champions League Profile
Eurobasket.com Profile
Draftexpress.com Profile
Greek Basket League Profile 
NBADraft.net Profile
Indiana State College Profile 
Sports-Reference Euro Stats
Sports-Reference College Stats
Ballers Abroad Profile

1991 births
Living people
Indiana State Sycamores men's basketball coaches
Indiana State Sycamores men's basketball players
Sportspeople from Terre Haute, Indiana
American expatriate basketball people in Germany
American expatriate basketball people in Greece
American expatriate basketball people in Russia
American expatriate basketball people in Turkey
American men's basketball players
Bandırma B.İ.K. players
Basketball players from Indiana
BC Nizhny Novgorod players
Medi Bayreuth players
P.A.O.K. BC players
Pistoia Basket 2000 players
Point guards
Promitheas Patras B.C. players
S.Oliver Würzburg players
Shooting guards